Cadet College Ghotki is an educational institution from grade 7 to grade 12, in the northern province of Sindh, Pakistan. It is jointly run by the Government of Sindh and the Pakistan Army.

It is located  about 90 km from Sukkur on the Grand Trunk Road/Pakistan National Highway leading to Rahimyar Khan District of the Province of Punjab. The college was inaugurated in November 2010.

Principals/Commandants
At the start of the college Prof. Nasim Ahmed Memon was appointed as first and the pioneer Principal of Cadet College Ghotki who joined the college in 2010 and remained on the seat for five years till 2015. In his tenure the main structure of Cadet College Ghotki was developed such as sports grounds, administrative and  academic blocks,  cadets' Mess  and hostels.

In 2015, Lt. Col. (R) Azhar Hussain Shah joined the college as second principal. He brought a revolutionary progress and development not only in academics but also in infrastructure of the college. Security of the college was enhanced. New Lawns and gardens were made. Incomplete projects were completed and shopping center, cafeteria and parade ground were built. He was the first principal who had initiated holding the Annual Parents' Day in 2017. But, in December, 2017, he resigned and joined as deputy manager in Fauji Fertilizers Company, Mirpur Mathelo.

Academics
The college prepares the boys for the Secondary School and Intermediate Examinations conducted by the Board of Intermediate and Secondary Education Sukkur. Cadets (Ghotkians) perform well in exams and until now they have given outstanding results in the examinations of 2015,2016,2017 & 2018 in Sukkur Board of Intermediate and Secondary Education.

Houses
At present there are Five Boarding Houses for the cadets. All houses are spacious, airy and equipped with Evaporating Cooling System. Four Houses
( Jinnah, Mathelo, Bhittai and Iqbal) have capacity of 80 cadets. Whereas, the ZAB house can accommodate 85 cadets.
The houses are administered by the House Masters and Deputy House Masters.

Cadets take part in sports such as cricket, football, volleyball, squash, swimming, tennis and table tennis. Fitness activities include gymnastics, jogging and running. Physical training (PT) and Drill are conducted in the morning and sports in the evening. Classes are conducted in the morning and preps at night. The tough routine ensures physical buildup as well as academic excellence. Participation in sports, PT/Drill is necessary for each and every cadet.

Faculty and Staff
The faculty comprises two academic departments, Science and Humanities:
 Humanities: English, Urdu, Sindhi, Pakistan Studies and Islamic Education.
 Sciences: Mathematics, Physics, Chemistry, Biology and Computer Science.

Physical training and drill of the students is supervised by the Pak Army( serving) drill instructors. The other staff comprises the Administrative Officer, Doctor, Psychologist, Bursar, Resident Engineer, Khateeb for the Mosque and the requisite ministerial staff.

Facilities and Miscellaneous
 Library
 Boarding Houses (Five Boarding Houses)
 Science Labs
 E-Learning Smart Classes equipped with latest technology
 Riding Club
Shopping Center
 Mosque
  Parade Ground
 Play Grounds
 IT Lab
 Guest House (Available for Invited Visitors/Parents only)
 Barber Shop
 Fruit Shop (All types of fresh Juices & Milk Shakes are available) 
 Cobbler Shop
 Garments Shop
 Tailor Shop
 vehicles

Sports

National level of Coaches for all sports are available throughout the year.

 Gymnasium
 Horse Riding Club (Saddle Club)
 Cricket
 Football
 Hockey
 Squash Courts
 Badminton Courts
 Volley Ball
 Archery Club
 Gymnastics Club

Medical
The college has a Hospital (with Ambulance Service available 24Hrs) headed by a senior doctor, with staff. For specialized treatment, the boys are sent to the DHQs hospital in Mirpur Mathelo or in Combined Military Hospital (CMH) Pano Aqil Cantt..
Vaccination and inoculation is carried out periodically. Students are medically examined and an individual health record is maintained.

Recreational Activities and cocurricular Activities
Picnics/Tours are arranged and the boys are taken to recreational spots in Pakistan as well as abroad (Turkey, United States of America and Malaysia). Educational visits are part of the training schedule at the college. Moreover, every passing out parade (twice a year) at Pakistan Military Academy (PMA) Kakul Abbottabad, is attended by more than 50 senior cadets (Ghotkians) of Cadet College Ghotki.
Furthermore, in accordance the academics calendar, Inter house competitions, such as Declamation, Hifze Iqbal, Hifze Latif, Essay Writing, Science and GK quiz and Naat and Qiraat etc, are regularly conducted.  Cadets also take part in different  sports and stage competitions held throughout the province and country.

College Magazine and Newsletter
The College Magazine- Reflections- is published annually in two sections (English/Urdu). Besides, a Newsletter- Glimpses- is issued on monthly basis.

Admissions at Cadet College Ghotki

Admissions to the college are entertained to class VII, VIII, IX and XI subject to specific and  general conditions as laid down:

Eligibility

a)	Everyone is entitled to apply from Pakistan as well as from overseas. However, some reserved seats are also available for the sons of persons domiciled in Sindh. They are entitled to apply for admission against seats reserved for residents of each administrative division, i.e., Sukkur, Larkana, MirpurKhas, Shaheed Benazir abad, Hyderabad and Karachi.

b)	Sons of persons domiciled in provinces other than Sindh, i.e., Punjab, Balochistan, Khyber-Pakhtunkhwa, Gilgit-Baltistan and Azad Jammu Kashmir.

c)	Sons of serving or retired defence personnel (uniformed only).

Age and qualification
11 to 13 & 12 to 14 years for class VII & VIII. 13 to 14 years for class IX & 15 to 16 years for class XI (No relaxation in age is permissible). Candidates must have passed class VI for VII, VII for VIII, VIII for class IX and X for class XI or equivalent.

References

2011 establishments in Pakistan
Cadet colleges in Pakistan
Educational institutions established in 2010
Schools in Sindh